This is a list of transactions that have taken place during the offseason and the 2016–17 PBA season.

List of transactions

Retirement

Coaching changes

Offseason

Player Movements

Trades

Pre-season

All-Filipino

Commissioner's Cup

Free agency

Additions

Released

Waived

2016 PBA draft

Previous years' draftees

References

transactions
transactions, 2016-17